Sinonovacula is a genus of bivalves.

Species include:
Sinonovacula constricta (Lamarck, 1818)
Sinonovacula mollis (G. B. Sowerby II, 1874)

References

Pharidae
Bivalve genera